Elatochori is a village and a community of the Katerini municipality. Before the 2011 local government reform it was part of the municipality of Pierioi, of which it was a municipal district. The 2011 census recorded 533 inhabitants in the village. The community of Elatochori covers an area of 38.872 km2.

Geography

Elatochori is situated west of Katerini, and south of Veria. It is a mountainous village that lies on the Pierian Mountains. There is also a ski resort 6 km from the village.

Population
According to the 2011 census, the population of Elatochori was 533 people, a decrease of almost 13% compared to the previous census of 2001.

Elatochori Ski Center
Elatochori is known for its ski center, which is located at an altitude of 1,400 to 1,800 meters (4,600 to 5,900 feet) on the southeastern slopes of the Pierian Mountains. At the base of the ski resort and at the location "Papá Choráfi", there is a dining room and a chalet with a total area of 450 sq.m. (4,840 sq.ft.) with a capacity of more than 400 people. It operated for the first time on a trial basis, in 2000, and officially in 2001. It is 8 km (5 miles) from the village and 36 km (22 miles) from the city of Katerini. The Ski Sports and Mountaineering Association operates in the Ski Center.

See also
 List of settlements in the Pieria regional unit

References

Ski areas and resorts in Greece
Populated places in Pieria (regional unit)